Burgundofara (died 643 or 655), also Saint Fara or Fare, was the founder and first Abbess of the Abbey of Faremoutiers.

Life
Her family is knowns as the Faronids, named after her brother Saint Faro. Her name may mean: 'She who moves the Burgundians'.

Jonas of Bobbio's life of Columbanus reports that she was blessed by the Irish monk when a child:Then Columban went to the city of Meaux. There he was received with great joy by a nobleman Hagneric (Chagneric, father of Burgundofara), who was a friend of Theudebert [King Theudebert II], a wise man, and a counsellor grateful to the king, and was fortified by nobility and wisdom. ... Columban blessed his house and consecrated to the Lord his daughter Burgundofara, who was still a child, and of whom we shall speak later.Burchi, Pietro. "Santa Fara (Burgundofara)", Santi e Beati, September 10, 2001

Jonas's life of Burgundofara picks up the tale. She is betrothed against her will, and against Columbanus' prediction, and straight away falls deathly sick. Her father Chagneric says to Eustasius of Luxeuil, who happens to be present, "Would that she might return to health and devote herself to divine service!" Burgundofara recovers, thanks to Eustasius's prayers, but her father goes back on his word and decides to give her away in marriage. She discovers this, and flees to the church of Saint Stephen in Meaux. There her brothers Faro and Chagnoald catch her, and are set on killing her for disobeying their father Chagneric, but the timely arrival of Eustasius settles matters.

With Eustasius's support, and the approval of Bishop Gundoald of Meaux, Burgundofara established an abbey on her father's lands. First called Evoriacum, it was later renamed Faremoutiers in her honour.

Studies of Burgundofara's life, and those of noble heiresses in similar situations, lead some writers to conclude that in fact the abbey was very likely established with her father's blessing, and the supposed parental insistence upon her marriage may have been no more than a front, especially if the marriage was proposed by the King. An edict of King Chilperic I a generation earlier had favoured the claims of daughters in inheritance over those of uncles and nephews, making the marriage of an heiress of considerable importance to the wider family.

The feast of Saint Burgundofara is celebrated on 3 April, probably in error. At Faremoutiers, she was commemorated on 7 December.

References

Sources
 Riché, Pierre, Dictionnaire des Francs: Les temps Mérovingiens. Eds. Bartillat, 1996. 
 Wickham, Chris The Inheritance of Rome: A History of Europe from 400 to 1000., 2009.

Further reading 

 Macnamara, Jo Ann, Halborg, John E. & Whatley, E. Gordon, Sainted Women of the Dark Ages. Duke University Press, 1992. 

Frankish abbesses
7th-century deaths
7th-century Frankish saints
Year of birth unknown

Year of death uncertain
Christian female saints of the Middle Ages
Colombanian saints
7th-century Frankish nuns